GymNation  is a  chain of fitness centers based in Dubai.

History
GymNation was established by Loren Holland, Frank Afeaki and Ant Martland in 2018. The first GymNation gym opened in June 2018 in Al Quoz, Dubai. In 2019, the company opened 2 new gyms, in Bur Dubai and Ras Al Khaimah. It added another 4 gyms in 2020, in Mirdif, Dubai Motor City, Silicon Oasis and Khalidiyah Mall in Abu Dhabi.

From March to late May 2020, all GymNation gyms were closed  due to COVID-19 lockdown. By mid 2021, GymNation became one of the largest chains of fitness centers in the United Arab Emirates.

In May 2021, GymNation signed a contract with the United Arab Emirates Rugby Federation and became the sponsor of the United Arab Emirates national rugby union team. Also in 2021, Amir Khan, the British boxing champ launched his first boxing academy in the Middle East in partnership with GymNation.

As of January 2022, GymNation had 8 gyms in the United Arab Emirates.

Acquisition 
In February 2022, JD Sports Gyms, part of FTSE 100 listed group JD Sports announced the acquisition of GymNation in its bid to expand within the Gulf Cooperation Council (GCC) region.

References

External links
Official website

Gyms
Health clubs
Emirati companies established in 2018